Marquette is a city in McPherson County, Kansas, United States.  As of the 2020 census, the population of the city was 599.  It is located between K-4 and the Smoky Hill River.

History
For millennia, the land now known as Kansas was inhabited by Native Americans.  In 1803, most of modern Kansas was secured by the United States as part of the Louisiana Purchase. In 1854, the Kansas Territory was organized, then in 1861 Kansas became the 34th U.S. state. In 1867, McPherson County was founded.

In 1873, what eventually would become Marquette began on the banks of the Smoky Hill River with a flour mill.  The site was surveyed and on February 9, 1874, the town was chartered. It was settled by Swedish immigrants and Civil War veterans. It was named after Marquette, Michigan. Marquette was located on the Missouri Pacific Railroad.

On the night of May 8–9, 1905, an F4 tornado destroyed much of the town, killing 34 people. Many homes in town were blown away and entire families were killed.

Geography
Marquette is located at  (38.553824, -97.833275), at an elevation of 1385 feet (422 m), in the Smoky Hills region of Kansas. The area is highlighted by outcrops of Cretaceous-era sandstone known as the Dakota Formation. The seas dating back to that era left hills and buttes which rise sharply about the surrounding plains.

Climate
The climate in this area is characterized by hot, humid summers and generally mild to cool winters.  According to the Köppen Climate Classification system, Marquette has a humid subtropical climate, abbreviated "Cfa" on climate maps.

Demographics

In May 2003, facing a declining population, Marquette was the first of at least ten other Kansas cities, including Ellsworth, Kanopolis, Holyrood and Wilson, who offer free land to attract residents. Fifty acres (200,000 m2) of what used to be farmland were developed, furnished with gravel streets, water, electric, sewer and gas hookups. In less than one year, twenty-one of the ⅓ acre (1,300 m2) lots created for this purpose were claimed. The program requires the landowners to build a house on the lot within a year, and live in that house for a year.

2010 census
As of the census of 2010, there were 641 people, 272 households, and 162 families residing in the city. The racial makeup of the city was 96.1% White, 0.2% African American, 0.2% Native American, 2.0% from other races, and 1.6% from two or more races. Hispanic or Latino of any race were 4.5% of the population.

There were 272 households, of which 25.7% had children under the age of 18 living with them, 45.6% were married couples living together, 9.9% had a female householder with no husband present, 4.0% had a male householder with no wife present, and 40.4% were non-families. 36.0% of all households were made up of individuals, and 15.8% had someone living alone who was 65 years of age or older. The average household size was 2.23 and the average family size was 2.90.

The median age in the city was 45.4 years. 22.8% of residents were under the age of 18; 5.8% were between the ages of 18 and 24; 20.7% were from 25 to 44; 27.9% were from 45 to 64; and 22.9% were 65 years of age or older. The gender makeup of the city was 45.6% male and 54.4% female.

2000 census
As of the census of 2000, there were 542 people, 243 households, and 157 families residing in the city, a decline from the total 1990 population of 593. The racial makeup of the city was 98.34% White, 0.37% Native American, 0.18% from other races, and 1.11% from two or more races. 0.18% of the population were Hispanic or Latino of any race.

There were 243 households, out of which 25.9% had children under the age of 18 living with them, 53.1% were married couples living together, 6.6% had a female householder with no husband present, and 35.0% were non-families. 31.7% of all households were made up of individuals, and 17.3% had someone living alone who was 65 years of age or older. The average household size was 2.23 and the average family size was 2.77.

In the city, the population was spread out, with 22.1% under the age of 18, 6.6% from 18 to 24, 29.0% from 25 to 44, 24.5% from 45 to 64, and 17.7% who were 65 years of age or older. The median age was 41 years. For every 100 females, there were 96.4 males. For every 100 females age 18 and over, there were 90.1 males.

As of 2000 the median income for a household in the city was $35,938, and the median income for a family was $44,531. Males had a median income of $30,000 versus $20,208 for females. The per capita income for the city was $17,965. 5.6% of the population and 3.8% of families were below the poverty line. Out of the total population, none of those under the age of 18 and 8.7% of those 65 and older were living below the poverty line.

Economy
Marquette is a town that is offering parcels of residential land for free on the condition that the recipient build a home within a specified deadline. In the few years since the program's inception, it has attracted an influx of new residents from who have decided to take advantage of the program and enjoy small-town living.

Attractions 

The downtown has a block of late 19th century stores that have been restored and repainted to their original colors. They are part of the Washington Street Historic District, a state historic site.

Nearby is the Hanson-Lindfors home, a sixteen-room Victorian style house built in 1888. It is named after Hans Hanson, one of the city founders, and has been restored to its original appearance and listed on the National Register of Historic Places. Located in the backyard of the home is Hanson's original 1871 wood-frame cabin, where the city charter was signed.

The downtown area includes the Range School Museum, a one-room 1906 schoolhouse moved there about eighty years later. Each spring and fall, local school children use it for a half day of class.

The Kansas Motorcycle Museum is located downtown on North Washington Street.  It was founded in 2004 by National Racing Champion, "Stan the Man" Engdahl, a native of Marquette.

Ten miles away is Kanopolis State Park, the first state park of Kansas. Game includes pheasant, quail, prairie chickens, deer, beaver, wild turkey, squirrels, rabbits, coyotes and waterfowl; fishing for white bass and crappie is popular.

Education
The community is served by Smoky Valley USD 400 public school district. The Smoky Valley High School mascot is Smoky Valley Vikings.

Marquette High School was closed through school unification in 1985. The Marquette High School mascot was Marquette Wolverines.

On June 7, 2014, the school in Marquette closed its doors for the last time, being closed due to poor funding from the school district.

Gallery
 Historic Images of Marquette, Special Photo Collections at Wichita State University Library

See also
 List of people from McPherson County, Kansas
 National Register of Historic Places listings in McPherson County, Kansas
 Hans Hanson House

References

Further reading

 Pioneers on the Prairie: A History of Marquette, Kansas; Allan Lindfors and Eleanor Burnison; Lindsborg News-Record; 1978.
 Marquette's Pioneer Day Memento; 75th Anniversary Planning Committee; 1949.

External links

 
 Marquette - Directory of Public Officials, League of Kansas Municipalities
 Marquette city map, KDOT

Cities in Kansas
Cities in McPherson County, Kansas
Populated places established in 1874
Swedish-American culture in Kansas
1874 establishments in Kansas